Charles Raymond Robertson (September 5, 1889February 18, 1951) was a U.S. Republican politician.

Robertson was born to Scottish immigrants on a farm in Arlington, Wisconsin and attended Poynette High School. He attended Parker College in Winnebago, Minnesota, where he studied commerce, and he moved to Mandan, North Dakota in 1917. He was elected as a Republican to the United States House of Representatives from North Dakota and served from January 3, 1941 to January 3, 1943.  He failed to be renominated to the House in 1942.  He was elected to the House in 1944 and again in 1946 and served from January 3, 1945 to January 3, 1949. He died of a heart attack in Bismarck, North Dakota.

Legacy
The Robertson Lignite Research Laboratory in Grand Forks, North Dakota was named after Robertson in 1951.

References

External links

1889 births
1951 deaths
People from Arlington, Wisconsin
Republican Party members of the United States House of Representatives from North Dakota
20th-century American politicians